The 2017 Israeli Basketball League Cup, for sponsorships reasons the Winner League Cup, was the 12th edition of the pre-season tournament of the Israeli Basketball Premier League. 

Maccabi Tel Aviv won the title for the seventh time after beating Ironi Nahariya 93–79 in the Final. John DiBartolomeo was named tournament MVP.

Bracket

Quarterfinals

Semifinals

Final

References

2017
League Cup